Miquelianin (quercetin 3-O-glucuronide) is a flavonol glucuronide, a type of phenolic compound present in wine, in species of St John's wort, like Hypericum hirsutum, in Nelumbo nucifera (Indian lotus) or in green beans.

It is also a rat plasma quercetin metabolite. It shows an antioxidant effect in human plasma.
In vitro studies indicate that miquelianin is able to reach the central nervous system from the small intestine.

See also 
 Phenolic content in wine

References 

Flavonoid glucuronides
Glucuronide esters
Quercetin glycosides